Santavuori may refer to:

 Santavuori (surname), a Finnish surname
 Santavuori (hill), a hill in Finland